There are over 9,000 Grade I listed buildings in England. This page is a list of these buildings in the Royal Borough of Kensington and Chelsea.

Buildings

|}

See also
 Grade II* listed buildings in Kensington and Chelsea

Notes

External links
 

 
Lists of Grade I listed buildings in London